Ragnar Hyltén-Cavallius (1885–1970) was a Swedish screenwriter and film director. Hyltén-Cavallius was of the screenwriters of the 1924 Greta Garbo film The Saga of Gosta Berling. He directed seven films including the 1926 co-production  A Sister of Six.

Selected filmography

Director
 A Sister of Six (1926)
 The Marriage Game (1935)
 Kungen kommer (1936)
 The Bells of the Old Town (1946)

Screenwriter
 House Slaves (1923)
 The Saga of Gosta Berling (1924)
 Ingmar's Inheritance (1925)
 To the Orient (1926)
 She Is the Only One (1926)
 Frida's Songs (1930)
 Black Roses (1932)
 Man's Way with Women (1934)
 Her Little Majesty (1939)
 The Bjorck Family (1940)

References

Bibliography
 Kwiatkowski, Aleksander. Swedish Film Classics. Courier Corporation, 2013.

External links

1885 births
1970 deaths
Writers from Stockholm
Swedish film directors
Swedish male screenwriters
20th-century Swedish screenwriters
20th-century Swedish male writers